This is a list of mayors from Asheville, North Carolina.

List of Mayors

See also
 Timeline of Asheville, North Carolina

References

Asheville